Kristi Leskinen (born February 10, 1981 in Uniontown, Pennsylvania) is an American freestyle skier. At Winter X Games IX, Leskinen won a bronze medal in the Women's Superpipe. Kristi Leskinen was the first woman to ever pull off a rodeo 720—two rotations with her head pointed towards  the earth. She was named one of the Twenty Greatest Adventure Sport Athletes of today by Faces Magazine in fall of 2005.  She appeared on the cover of Powder magazine's Photo Annual in 2004.

Early life

Leskinen was born in 1981 and grew up in Uniontown, Pennsylvania near Seven Springs Mountain Resort and Hidden Valley Resort.  She seemed to master every sport she came in contact with.  For example, she learned to pole vault two weeks before Regional’s her senior year of high school and she ended up setting a school record while qualifying for the State Championships.  In addition, she was the Western Pennsylvania breaststroke champion.

Leskinen’s favorite sports growing up were skiing and wakeboarding.  She won the first mogul contest she entered and she was being groomed to compete in the Olympics as a teenager.  Moguls did not offer the freedom she craved, so she switched to wakeboarding.  She took second in the US Wakeboard Nationals and fourth at the World Championship.  In 2000, while attending the US Open, she spotted some pros having a practice session on a rail.  It was the freedom she always looked for in skiing.  She realized that freeskiing is more challenging than wakeboarding so she chose a career on the snow.

Professional career 
In her first US Open, Leskinen was the only women doing the Big Air event and one of the handful of women participating on the Superpipe.  By 2004, the sport had grown and the US Open had 40 athletes participating in the Superpipe, the largest of its kind in the world.  She took second place.

Leskinen realized that videos reach a bigger audience than a single contest.  She started filming all over the world.
In 2005, she took bronze at the Winter X Games as well as a silver at the World Championship in the Halfpipe.  In the same year, she placed first at the Gravity Games Halfpipe. Since that season, she has had many notable performances such as second place in the North American Open in 2008, third place in the European Open in 2008, and second in the Aspen Open in 2009.

Career highlights 
2009 3rd place, Homecoming
2009 5th place, Dew Tour Slopestyle- Mt Snow, VT
2009 2nd place, Aspen Open Slopestyle
2008 3rd place, European Open Slopestyle- Laax, Switzerland
2008 2nd place, North American Open
2007 2nd place, Nippon Freeski Open
2005 3rd place, Winter X Games Halfpipe
2005 2nd place, US Open Halfpipe
2005 1st place, Gravity Games Halfpipe
2004 2nd place, US Freeskiing Open Superpipe- Vail, CO

Modeling and television career
With her classic high cheekbones and blonde tresses, Leskinen became a pin-up girl in sponsor posters. She was named of the "100 Hottest Women of 2005" by FHM.

In early 2009, Leskinen appeared on the show The Superstars on ABC.  Along with her partner, dancer Maksim Chmerkovskiy from Dancing with the Stars, they competed against other pairs of athletes and celebrities in a series of athletic events.  They won first place.

Leskinen appeared on the 30th season of The Amazing Race with teammate Jen Hudak where they finished in 3rd place.

Personal life
Leskinen resides in Mammoth Lakes, California.  She continues to wakeboard and she dedicates a few weeks a year to ride in Orlando, Florida.

References

External links 
 Homepage
 EXPN Bio

1981 births
Living people
People from Uniontown, Pennsylvania
American female freestyle skiers
American people of Finnish descent
X Games athletes
Sportspeople from Pennsylvania
People from Mammoth Lakes, California
The Amazing Race (American TV series) contestants